is the fifth single by the Japanese girl idol group Team Syachihoko, released in Japan on October 30, 2013 by Unborde Records (Warner Music Japan).

Release details 
The single was released in three versions: a limited edition, Nationwide Edition (a regular edition), and Nagoya & Venue Edition (a version that will only be distributed in Nagoya and at live events).

Track listing

Limited Edition, Nationwide (Regular) Edition

Nagoya & Venue Limited Edition

Charts

References

External links 
 Warner Music Japan profiles
 Limited Edition
 Nationwide Edition (Regular Edition)
 Nagoya & Venue edition

Team Syachihoko songs
2013 singles
Japanese-language songs
Unborde singles
2013 songs